Khaled is a male Arabic name, and may refer to:

People
 Khaled Azhari (born 1966), Egyptian politician 
 Khaled Chehab (1886–1978), Lebanese politician
 Khaled (musician), an Algerian Raï musician
 DJ Khaled, a Palestinian-American DJ

Surname
 Amr Khaled, an American Muslim activist and television preacher
 Leila Khaled, a Palestinian refugee and member of the Popular Front for the Liberation of Palestine
 Mahjabeen Khaled, a Bangladeshi politician from the Bangladesh Awami League party

Other
 Khaled (album), the self-titled album by the Algerian musician (above)
 Khaled (film), a 2011 Canadian drama film, directed by Asghar Massombagi
 Khaled (horse), thoroughbred racehorse
 Khaled: A Tale of Arabia, an 1891 novel by F. Marion Crawford

See also 
 Khalid (disambiguation)